Paseo Reforma (Reform Mall) is a regional  indoor mall located in Nuevo Laredo, Tamaulipas, Mexico south in the city's retail district. The shopping mall was built from 2007-2008 and was opened in May 2008 at a cost to developer Latin American Realty of $90 million. It was the first mall of its kind in Nuevo Laredo. The mall has three major anchors (Walmart Super Center, The Home Depot, and Cinépolis) and has sub-anchors such as Famsa. The mall is situated in a lot with a total area of 1,356,468 ft² (126,020 m²) which includes 2,000 parking spaces and 6 pads for restaurants outside the mall.

External links
Paseo Reforma official website (Spanish)
Latin American Realty official website

References

 

Shopping malls in Mexico
Shopping malls established in 2008
Nuevo Laredo
Buildings and structures in Tamaulipas